The Colorado River Indian Tribes (Mojave language 'Aha Havasuu, Navajo language: Tó Ntsʼósíkooh Bibąąhgi Bitsįʼ Yishtłizhii Bináhásdzo) is a federally recognized tribe consisting of the four distinct ethnic groups associated with the Colorado River Indian Reservation: the Mohave, Chemehuevi, Hopi, and Navajo. The tribe has about 4,277 enrolled members. A total population of 9,485 currently resides within the tribal reservation according to the 2012-2016 American Community Survey data.

History
The reservation was established on March 3, 1865, for "Indians of said river and its tributaries." Initially, these were the Mojave and Chemehuevi, but Hopi and Navajo people were relocated to the reservation in 1945. John Scott designed the tribal seal in 1966, with four feathers to represent the four CRIT tribes. Margie McCabe designed the tribal flag, which the tribe formally adopted in 1979.

Reservation

The Colorado River Indian Reservation is a Native American reservation in the southwest United States. Its territory is primarily in western La Paz County, Arizona, with smaller portions in southeastern San Bernardino, and northeastern Riverside counties, California. It borders the Palo Verde Valley in the southwest boundaries. Tribal headquarters are in Parker, Arizona. 
Tribal members mainly live in communities in and around Parker, the largest community, and Poston. The 2000 census reported a population of 9,201 persons residing on the reservation.

Government

The tribe and its reservation territory are governed by an elected council of nine members and overseen by a tribal Chairman, Secretary, and Treasurer. These officers are elected from among the council members. The four tribes continue to maintain and observe their traditional ways and religious and culturally unique identities.

The current administration is:
 Chairwoman: Amelia Flores
 Vice-Chairman: Dwight Lomayesva
 Tribal Secretary: Johnson "JD" Fisher
 Tribal Treasurer: Anisa Patch
 Council Member: Thomas "Tommy" Drennan
 Council Member: Woodrow Sharp
 Council Member: Josephine Tahbo
 Council Member: Jaymee Moore
 Council Member: Robert "Bobby" Page

Economic development

The economy for the tribe is based on light industry, government, recreation, and agricultural, specifically growing commodity crops of alfalfa, cotton, lettuce, and sorghum. The Colorado River Indian Tribes (CRIT) has senior water rights to divert up to 719,248 acre feet of water from the Colorado River, which represents nearly one-third of the allocation for the state of Arizona.

It opened in June 1999. The resort features a 200-room hotel, a  bingo hall, an indoor water park, movie theater, video arcade, marina, and concert facilities.

The Colorado River Indian Tribe Museum and Gift Shop is in Parker, Arizona, and has displays of historical and contemporary artworks, especially ceramics, made by tribal members.

Communities
Bluewater, Arizona
Bluewater, California
Parker, Arizona (seat of government)
Poston, Arizona

Notable tribal members
Jacoby Ellsbury (b. 1983), baseball center fielder with the Boston Red Sox and New York Yankees of Major League Baseball
Veronica Murdock (born 1944), tribal vice chair and first woman president of the National Congress of American Indians

See also
 Indigenous rights to land along rivers

Notes

References
Colorado River Reservation, Arizona/California United States Census Bureau

External links
 Colorado River Indian Tribes, official website
 River Bend Fire Station, Riverside County, CA
 Lost Lake Fire Station, Riverside County, CA
 BlueWater Resort and Casino

1865 establishments in the United States
American Indian reservations in Arizona
American Indian reservations in California
Chemehuevi
Colorado River tribes
Communities in the Lower Colorado River Valley
Federally recognized tribes in the United States
Geography of La Paz County, Arizona
Geography of San Bernardino County, California
Hopi
Lower Colorado River Valley
Mohave tribe
Navajo
Native American tribes in Arizona
Native American tribes in California
Native American tribes in Riverside County, California
California populated places on the Colorado River
Arizona populated places on the Colorado River